In United States law, the term color of law denotes the "mere semblance of legal right," the "pretense or appearance of" right; hence, an action done under color of law adjusts (colors) the law to the circumstance, yet said apparently legal action contravenes the law. Under color of authority is a legal phrase used in North America indicating that a person is claiming or implying the acts they are committing are related to and legitimized by his or her role as an agent of governmental power.

Color of law
Color of law refers to an appearance of legal power to act that may operate in violation of law. For example, if a police officer acts with the "color of law" authority to arrest someone, the arrest, if it is made without probable cause, may actually be in violation of law. In other words, just because something is done with the "color of law" does not mean that the action was lawful.  When police are suspected of acting outside their lawful authority and violating the civil rights of a citizen, the FBI may be tasked with investigating.

The US Supreme Court has interpreted the US Constitution to construct laws regulating the actions of the law enforcement community. Under "color of law," it is a crime for one or more persons using power given by a governmental agency (local, state or federal), to deprive or conspire willfully to deprive another person of any right protected by the Constitution or laws of the United States. Criminal acts under color of law include acts within and beyond the bounds or limits of lawful authority. Off-duty conduct may also be covered if official status is asserted in some manner. Color of law may include public officials and non-governmental employees who are not law enforcement officers such as judges, prosecutors, and private security guards.

Deprivation of rights under color of law

The deprivation of rights under color of law is a federal criminal offense which occurs when any person, under color of any law, statute, ordinance, regulation, or custom, willfully subjects any person on any U.S. territory or possession to the deprivation of any rights, privileges, or immunities secured or protected by the Constitution or laws of the United States, or to different punishments, pains, or penalties, on account of such person being an alien, or by reason of his color, or race, than are prescribed for the punishment of citizens. When two or more persons conspire to prevent the exercise of constitutional rights, or to punish an individual for having exercised them, it is deemed a conspiracy against rights. The death penalty is applicable in extreme cases when the crimes cause the death of the individual being deprived of statutory or constitutional rights. Remedy by civil action is also possible: .

Color of office
"Color of office" refers to an act usually committed by a public official under the appearance of authority but exceeds such authority. An affirmative act or omission, committed under color of office, is sometimes required to prove malfeasance in office.

Color of title
"Color of title", in property law, refers to a claim to title that appears valid but may be legally defective. Color of title may arise if there is evidence, such as a writing, suggesting valid legal title. The courts have ruled that deeds are mere color of title; the actual title to land is secured with an irrefutable instrument, like a land patent. When that land is subsequently conveyed to another owner by a deed, the deed colors the title to show the new owner. Thus, the chain of title from the land patent to the present may include many deeds. The actual title remains with the land patent and lawful deeds show the chain of title to the present landowner. Because the ownership in land is a very specific thing, requiring precise and proper transfers of ownership, it used to be that people always required a certified abstract be provided with a deed to ensure the deed was not merely a color of title fiction.  Today, title companies offer title insurance to secure such documents. Still, only a proper and lawful title, like the land patent, provides actual title to land; and only a proper and lawful chain of title (deeds, etc.) from such a patent to the present can secure land rights to the landowner.

However, even with land secured by patent, the proper grant of title can be implied by adverse possession, which is the basis for claims exemplified in Torrens title. The Torrens system operates on the principle of "title by registration" in which the act of registering an interest in land in a state-operated registry creates an indefeasible title in the registrant, which, like the land patent, can be challenged only in very limited circumstances.

Appropriation of name or likeness

Although it is a common-law tort, most states have enacted statutes that prohibit the use of a person's name or image if used without consent for the commercial benefit of another person. A person's exclusive rights to control his or her name and likeness to prevent others from exploiting personal information without permission is protected in similar manner to a title or trademark action with the person's likeness and personal information, rather than the trademark or title, being the subject of the protection.

The tort of false light involves a misappropriation or "major misrepresentation" of a person's "character, history, activities or belief". Some bodies of law also explicitly mention the estate of a person; false claims of nobility are most common. In the US, one who gives publicity to a matter concerning another that places the other before the public in a false light is subject to liability for invasion of privacy if
 The false light would be highly offensive to a reasonable person; and
 The actor acted with malice—had reason to know of or acted with reckless disregard as to the falsity of the publicized matter and the false light in which the other would be placed.

See Section 652E of the Restatement (Second) of Torts.

Public disclosure of private facts arises if a person reveals information which is not of public concern, the release of which would offend a reasonable person.

See also
 Qualified immunity – a contrasting legal doctrine that may protect government officers from civil-suit damages.

References

American legal terminology